Stokeley (stylized in all caps) is the debut studio album by American rapper Ski Mask the Slump God. It was released on November 30, 2018, by Victor Victor Worldwide and Republic Records. The album features guest appearances from Juice Wrld, Austin Lam, Lil Baby and Lil Yachty.

Commercial performance
In the United States, Stokeley debuted at number 6 on the US Billboard 200 chart, earning 51,000 album-equivalent units, with 5,000 coming from pure album sales in its first week.

Track listing
Credits adapted from Tidal.

Notes
 signifies a co-producer
 "Save Me, Pt. 2" features additional vocals from Samaria
 "La La" is stylized in all caps

Sample credits
 "Foot Fungus" contains an interpolation of "Drop It Like It's Hot", performed by Snoop Dogg and Pharrell.

Personnel
Credits adapted from Tidal.

 Adrian Lau – recording 
 Fresh ThPharmacy – recording 
 Leighton "LG" Griffith – recording 
 Alex Tumay – mixing 
 Thomas "Tillie" Mann – mixing 
 Joe LaPorta – mastering

Charts

Weekly charts

Year-end charts

Certifications

References

2018 debut albums
Ski Mask the Slump God albums
Albums produced by Cubeatz
Albums produced by Murda Beatz
Albums produced by Ronny J
Albums produced by WondaGurl
Republic Records albums